Alonso de Villegas Selvago, also known as  Selvago, which may also have been a second surname, of Genovese origin (Toledo, 1533 - ib., January 23, 1603) was a Spanish ecclesiastic and writer.

Biography 
As a student and later professor of theology at the universidad de Toledo, was a chaplain in his cathedral and baptized in the church of San Sebastián and in San Marcos in the same city, where he resided for almost his entire life.

His only known works include Comedia llamada Selvagia: en que se introduzen los amores de un cavallero llamado Selvago con una ilustre dama dicha Ysabela, efetuados por Dolosina, alcahueta famosa (Toledo: Joan Ferrer, 1554), one Life of San Isidro Labrador (Madrid, 1592), one Life of San Tirso (Toledo, 1592) and a Flos sanctorum in six volumes — 
a collection of stories in various manuscripts (which was read by Tomás Tamayo de Vargas) has been lost. One of Villegas's subjects in the Flos sanctorum was Saint Irene based on a popular legend in the Iberian Peninsula called La margarita del Tajo. He also drew from Plutarch's work for the story detailing the death of Pan when Jesus was born.

References 

16th-century Spanish writers
16th-century male writers
1603 deaths
1533 births
People from Toledo, Spain